The 1996 Alabama Crimson Tide baseball team is a baseball team that represented the University of Alabama in the 1996 NCAA Division I baseball season. The Crimson Tide were members of the Southeastern Conference and played their home games at Sewell–Thomas Stadium in Tuscaloosa, Alabama. They were led by second-year head coach Jim Wells.

Roster

Schedule 

! style="" | Regular Season
|- valign="top" 

|- align="center" bgcolor="#ccffcc"
| 1 || February 9 || vs  || Osceola County Stadium • Kissimmee, Florida || 7–2 || 1–0 || –
|- align="center" bgcolor="#ccffcc"
| 2 || February 10 || vs  || Osceola County Stadium • Kissimmee, Florida || 10–7 || 2–0 || –
|- align="center" bgcolor="#ffcccc"
| 3 || February 11 || vs  || Osceola County Stadium • Kissimmee, Florida || 6–7 || 2–1 || –
|- align="center" bgcolor="#ccffcc"
| 4 || February 16 ||  || Sewell–Thomas Stadium • Tuscaloosa, Alabama || 6–5 || 3–1 || –
|- align="center" bgcolor="#ccffcc"
| 5 || February 17 || Centenary || Sewell–Thomas Stadium • Tuscaloosa, Alabama || 9–2 || 4–1 || –
|- align="center" bgcolor="#ccffcc"
| 6 || February 18 || Centenary || Sewell–Thomas Stadium • Tuscaloosa, Alabama || 6–1 || 5–1 || –
|- align="center" bgcolor="#ffcccc"
| 7 || February 21 ||  || Sewell–Thomas Stadium • Tuscaloosa, Alabama || 3–4 || 5–2 || –
|- align="center" bgcolor="#ccffcc"
| 8 || February 23 || at  || Warhawk Field • Monroe, Louisiana || 8–2 || 6–2 || –
|- align="center" bgcolor="#ccffcc"
| 9 || February 24 || at Northeast Louisiana || Warhawk Field • Monroe, Louisiana || 7–1 || 7–2 || –
|- align="center" bgcolor="#ffcccc"
| 10 || February 25 || at Northeast Louisiana || Warhawk Field • Monroe, Louisiana || 3–5 || 7–3 || –
|- align="center" bgcolor="#ccffcc"
| 11 || February 27 ||  || Sewell–Thomas Stadium • Tuscaloosa, Alabama || 6–1 || 8–3 || –
|- align="center" bgcolor="#ccffcc"
| 12 || February 28 ||  || Sewell–Thomas Stadium • Tuscaloosa, Alabama || 19–4 || 9–3 || –
|-

|- align="center" bgcolor="#ffcccc"
| 13 || March 1 ||  || Sewell–Thomas Stadium • Tuscaloosa, Alabama || 8–13 || 9–4 || –
|- align="center" bgcolor="#ccffcc"
| 14 || March 2 || UNC Greensboro || Sewell–Thomas Stadium • Tuscaloosa, Alabama || 9–3 || 10–4 || –
|- align="center" bgcolor="#ccffcc"
| 15 || March 3 || UNC Greensboro || Sewell–Thomas Stadium • Tuscaloosa, Alabama || 12–3 || 11–4 || –
|- align="center" bgcolor="#ccffcc"
| 16 || March 5 || at  || Joe Lee Griffin Stadium • Birmingham, Alabama || 5–4 || 12–4 || –
|- align="center" bgcolor="#ffcccc"
| 17 || March 8 || at  || Foley Field • Athens, Georgia || 1–11 || 12–5 || 0–1
|- align="center" bgcolor="#ccffcc"
| 18 || March 9 || at Georgia || Foley Field • Athens, Georgia || 9–6 || 13–5 || 1–1
|- align="center" bgcolor="#ccffcc"
| 19 || March 10 || at Georgia || Foley Field • Athens, Georgia || 6–4 || 14–5 || 2–1
|- align="center" bgcolor="#ffcccc"
| 20 || March 12 ||  || Sewell–Thomas Stadium • Tuscaloosa, Alabama || 3–6 || 14–6 || 2–1
|- align="center" bgcolor="#ccffcc"
| 21 || March 13 || Murray State || Sewell–Thomas Stadium • Tuscaloosa, Alabama || 9–3 || 15–6 || 2–1
|- align="center" bgcolor="#ffcccc"
| 22 || March 16 || Florida || Sewell–Thomas Stadium • Tuscaloosa, Alabama || 8–9 || 15–7 || 2–2
|- align="center" bgcolor="#ccffcc"
| 23 || March 16 || Florida || Sewell–Thomas Stadium • Tuscaloosa, Alabama || 3–2 || 16–7 || 3–2
|- align="center" bgcolor="#ccffcc"
| 24 || March 17 || Florida || Sewell–Thomas Stadium • Tuscaloosa, Alabama || 8–4 || 17–7 || 4–2
|- align="center" bgcolor="#ccffcc"
| 25 || March 19 ||  || Sewell–Thomas Stadium • Tuscaloosa, Alabama || 10–2 || 18–7 || 4–2
|- align="center" bgcolor="#ffcccc"
| 26 || March 20 || Eastern Kentucky || Sewell–Thomas Stadium • Tuscaloosa, Alabama || 7–8 || 18–8 || 4–2
|- align="center" bgcolor="#ccffcc"
| 27 || March 22 ||  || Sewell–Thomas Stadium • Tuscaloosa, Alabama || 2–0 || 19–8 || 5–2
|- align="center" bgcolor="#ffcccc"
| 28 || March 23 || Tennessee || Sewell–Thomas Stadium • Tuscaloosa, Alabama || 2–6 || 19–9 || 5–3
|- align="center" bgcolor="#ccffcc"
| 29 || March 24 || Tennessee || Sewell–Thomas Stadium • Tuscaloosa, Alabama || 5–4 || 20–9 || 6–3
|- align="center" bgcolor="#ccffcc"
| 30 || March 26 || at  || Eddie Stanky Field • Mobile, Alabama || 1–0 || 21–9 || 6–3
|- align="center" bgcolor="#ffcccc"
| 31 || March 29 || at  || McGugin Field • Nashville, Tennessee || 0–5 || 21–10 || 6–4
|- align="center" bgcolor="#ccffcc"
| 32 || March 30 || at Vanderbilt || McGugin Field • Nashville, Tennessee || 14–13 || 22–10 || 7–4
|- align="center" bgcolor="#ccffcc"
| 33 || March 31 || at Vanderbilt || McGugin Field • Nashville, Tennessee || 14–11 || 23–10 || 8–4
|-

|- align="center" bgcolor="#ccffcc"
| 34 || April 2 ||  || Paterson Field • Montgomery, Alabama || 2–0 || 24–10 || 8–4
|- align="center" bgcolor="#ccffcc"
| 35 || April 5 || at  || Cliff Hagan Stadium • Lexington, Kentucky || 17–4 || 25–10 || 9–4
|- align="center" bgcolor="#ffcccc"
| 36 || April 6 || at Kentucky || Cliff Hagan Stadium • Lexington, Kentucky || 2–3 || 25–11 || 9–5
|- align="center" bgcolor="#ccffcc"
| 37 || April 7 || at Kentucky || Cliff Hagan Stadium • Lexington, Kentucky || 4–1 || 26–11 || 10–5
|- align="center" bgcolor="#ccffcc"
| 38 || April 10 ||  || Sewell–Thomas Stadium • Tuscaloosa, Alabama || 17–6 || 27–11 || 10–5
|- align="center" bgcolor="#ccffcc"
| 39 || April 12 ||  || Sewell–Thomas Stadium • Tuscaloosa, Alabama || 3–1 || 28–11 || 11–5
|- align="center" bgcolor="#ccffcc"
| 40 || April 13 || Mississippi State || Sewell–Thomas Stadium • Tuscaloosa, Alabama || 5–4 || 29–11 || 12–5
|- align="center" bgcolor="#ffcccc"
| 41 || April 13 || Mississippi State || Sewell–Thomas Stadium • Tuscaloosa, Alabama || 1–5 || 29–12 || 12–6
|- align="center" bgcolor="#ccffcc"
| 42 || April 17 || at UAB || Jerry D. Young Memorial Field • Birmingham, Alabama || 12–5 || 30–12 || 12–6
|- align="center" bgcolor="#ffcccc"
| 43 || April 19 ||  || Sewell–Thomas Stadium • Tuscaloosa, Alabama || 1–3 || 30–13 || 12–7
|- align="center" bgcolor="#ffcccc"
| 44 || April 20 || Ole Miss || Sewell–Thomas Stadium • Tuscaloosa, Alabama || 3–8 || 30–14 || 12–8
|- align="center" bgcolor="#ccffcc"
| 45 || April 21 || Ole Miss || Sewell–Thomas Stadium • Tuscaloosa, Alabama || 9–5 || 31–14 || 13–8
|- align="center" bgcolor="#ccffcc"
| 46 || April 22 ||  || Sewell–Thomas Stadium • Tuscaloosa, Alabama || 8–2 || 32–14 || 13–8
|- align="center" bgcolor="#ccffcc"
| 47 || April 24 || Samford || Sewell–Thomas Stadium • Tuscaloosa, Alabama || 8–2 || 33–14 || 13–8
|- align="center" bgcolor="#ffcccc"
| 48 || April 26 || at LSU || Alex Box Stadium • Baton Rouge, Louisiana || 6–8 || 33–15 || 13–9
|- align="center" bgcolor="#ccffcc"
| 49 || April 27 || at LSU || Alex Box Stadium • Baton Rouge, Louisiana || 17–4 || 34–15 || 14–9
|- align="center" bgcolor="#ccffcc"
| 50 || April 28 || at LSU || Alex Box Stadium • Baton Rouge, Louisiana || 12–5 || 35–15 || 15–9
|-

|- align="center" bgcolor="#ffcccc"
| 51 || May 3 || at  || Baum–Walker Stadium • Fayetteville, Arkansas || 3–9 || 35–16 || 15–10
|- align="center" bgcolor="#ccffcc"
| 52 || May 4 || at Arkansas || Baum–Walker Stadium • Fayetteville, Arkansas || 7–3 || 36–16 || 16–10
|- align="center" bgcolor="#ccffcc"
| 53 || May 5 || at Arkansas || Baum–Walker Stadium • Fayetteville, Arkansas || 3–2 || 37–16 || 17–10
|- align="center" bgcolor="#ccffcc"
| 54 || May 10 || Auburn || Sewell–Thomas Stadium • Tuscaloosa, Alabama || 1–0 || 38–16 || 18–10
|- align="center" bgcolor="#ccffcc"
| 55 || May 11 || Auburn || Sewell–Thomas Stadium • Tuscaloosa, Alabama || 7–1 || 39–16 || 19–10
|- align="center" bgcolor="#ccffcc"
| 56 || May 12 || Auburn || Sewell–Thomas Stadium • Tuscaloosa, Alabama || 4–0 || 40–16 || 20–10
|-

|-
! style="" | Postseason
|- valign="top"

|- align="center" bgcolor="#ccffcc"
| 57 || May 16 || vs Kentucky || Hoover Metropolitan Stadium • Hoover, Alabama || 3–2 || 41–16 || 20–10
|- align="center" bgcolor="#ccffcc"
| 58 || May 17 || vs Tennessee || Hoover Metropolitan Stadium • Hoover, Alabama || 3–1 || 42–16 || 20–10
|- align="center" bgcolor="#ffcccc"
| 59 || May 18 || vs Florida || Hoover Metropolitan Stadium • Hoover, Alabama || 3–7 || 42–17 || 20–10
|- align="center" bgcolor="#ccffcc"
| 60 || May 18 || vs Kentucky || Hoover Metropolitan Stadium • Hoover, Alabama || 16–8 || 43–17 || 20–10
|- align="center" bgcolor="#ccffcc"
| 61 || May 19 || vs Florida || Hoover Metropolitan Stadium • Hoover, Alabama || 10–5 || 44–17 || 20–10
|- align="center" bgcolor="#ccffcc"
| 62 || May 19 || vs Florida || Hoover Metropolitan Stadium • Hoover, Alabama || 15–5 || 45–17 || 20–10
|-

|- align="center" bgcolor="#ccffcc"
| 63 || May 23 ||  || Sewell–Thomas Stadium • Tuscaloosa, Alabama || 19–2 || 46–17 || 20–10
|- align="center" bgcolor="#ccffcc"
| 64 || May 24 || South Alabama || Sewell–Thomas Stadium • Tuscaloosa, Alabama || 9–3 || 47–17 || 20–10
|- align="center" bgcolor="#ccffcc"
| 65 || May 25 ||  || Sewell–Thomas Stadium • Tuscaloosa, Alabama || 3–1 || 48–17 || 20–10
|- align="center" bgcolor="#ccffcc"
| 66 || May 26 ||  || Sewell–Thomas Stadium • Tuscaloosa, Alabama || 18–8 || 49–17 || 20–10
|-

|- align="center" bgcolor="#ccffcc"
| 67 || May 31 || vs Oklahoma State || Johnny Rosenblatt Stadium • Omaha, Nebraska || 7–5 || 50–17 || 20–10
|- align="center" bgcolor="#ffcccc"
| 68 || June 2 || vs Miami (FL) || Johnny Rosenblatt Stadium • Omaha, Nebraska || 1–15 || 50–18 || 20–10
|- align="center" bgcolor="#ffcccc"
| 69 || June 4 || vs Clemson || Johnny Rosenblatt Stadium • Omaha, Nebraska || 13–14 || 50–19 || 20–10
|-

Awards and honors 
Skip Ames
 ABCA All-South Region Team

Andy Bernard
 South I Regional All-Tournament Team

Joe Caruso
 South I Regional All-Tournament Team
 SEC All-Tournament Team
 SEC Tournament MVP

Joel Colgrove
 South I Regional All-Tournament Team
 South I Regional MVP

Doug Hall
 SEC All-Tournament Team

Dustan Mohr
 SEC All-Tournament Team

Chris Moller
 SEC All-Tournament Team
 College World Series All-Tournament Team

Dax Norris
 ABCA All-South Region Team
 First Team All-SEC

Brett Taft
 South I Regional All-Tournament Team

David Tidwell
 South I Regional All-Tournament Team

Tim Young
 Second Team All-SEC

References 

Alabama
Alabama Crimson Tide baseball seasons
Alabama Crimson Tide baseball
College World Series seasons
Alabama
Southeastern Conference baseball champion seasons